Albidovulum xiamenense is a moderately thermophilic, rod-shaped, aerobic and motile bacteria from the genus of Albidovulum which has been isolated from wather from a hot spring from Xiamen in China.

References 

Rhodobacteraceae
Bacteria described in 2012